General San Martín Partido is a partido in the Gran Buenos Aires urban area, immediately to the north-west of the Capital federal in Buenos Aires Province, Argentina.

Name
The partido (district) and its capital are named in honor of General José de San Martín, who led Argentina against the Spanish Empire in the Argentine War of Independence.

Sports
The partido is home to Primera División football team Chacarita Juniors, and to fifth Division football team Club Social y Deportivo Central Ballester.

In rugby union San Martín partido is home to CEC Liceo Militar.

Districts
 Barrio Parque General San Martín
 Billinghurst
 Ciudad del Libertador General José de San Martín
 Ciudad Jardín El Libertador
 Loma Hermosa
 José León Suárez
 San Andrés
 Villa Ballester
 Villa Libertad
 Villa Lynch
 Villa Maipú

Smaller neighbourhoods
These neighbourhoods have been absorbed into the municipality and are no longer commonly used.

 Villa Ayacucho
 Villa Bernardo Monteagudo
 Villa Chacabuco
 Villa Coronel José M. Zapiola
 Villa General Antonio J. de Sucre
 Villa General Eugenio Necochea
 Villa General José Tomás Guido
 Villa General Juan G. Las Heras
 Villa Godoy Cruz
 Villa Granaderos de San Martín
 Villa Gregoria Matorras
 Villa Juan Martín de Pueyrredón
 Villa María Irene de los Remedios de Escalada
 Villa Marqués Alejandro María de Aguado
 Villa Parque Presidente Figueroa Alcorta
 Villa Parque San Lorenzo
 Villa Yapeyú

Gallery

Notable people
José Hernández, (1834-1886) journalist and poet
Óscar Alfredo Gálvez, (1913-1989) racing driver
Pedro Opeka, (b. 1948), Catholic missionary 
Zully Moreno, (1920-1999) actress
Fernando Siro, (1931-2006) actor, film director and screenwriter
Roberto DeVicenzo, (b. 1923) golfer
Virginia Gamba, (b.1954) Under Secretary General, United Nations

References

External links

 
 San Martín news

 
1852 establishments in Argentina
Partidos of Buenos Aires Province